Candaba, officially the Municipality of Candaba (Kapampangan: Balen ning Candaba; ; formerly Candawe), is a 1st class municipality in the province of Pampanga, Philippines. According to the 2020 census, it has a population of 119,497 people.

History

Geography
Candaba represents the lowest point in Central Luzon Region of Luzon Island. The neighboring municipality of San Miguel (San Miguel de Mayumo) in Bulacan province used to be part of Candaba until San Miguel became a municipality itself.

Candaba's municipal boundaries are: Municipality of Arayat, Pampanga, and Municipality of Cabiao, Nueva Ecija, to the north; Municipality of San Miguel, Bulacan, and Municipality of San Ildefonso, Bulacan, to the east; Municipality of Baliuag, Bulacan, to the south; Municipality of San Luis, Pampanga, and Municipality of Santa Ana, Pampanga, to the west.

Candaba is also divided to 3 regions, the Tagalog Region comprising the southern part of Candaba which was a boundary between it and Baliuag and San Ildefonso, next is the Poblacion Region to the west which boundaries with Sta Ana, and next is the Kapampangan Region to the east which boundaries San Miguel.

Barangays 
Candaba is politically subdivided into 33 barangays.

Climate

Like rest of the area in Central Luzon, there are two seasons in the area, the wet season and dry season. The wet season occurs during the months of May to October, and the dry season the rest of the year.

Demographics

Religion
Roman Catholic 60%, Members Church of God International 3.5%, Iglesia ni Cristo 3%, Evangelicals 32%, others (includes Islam, Buddhism and other religions) 1.5%.
The San Andres Apostol Parish serves as one of the Roman Catholic parish churches inside the municipality. Founded way back 1575, this parish is the oldest parish of the town that houses the town's patron, San Andres Apostol otherwise known as Apung Dalis, who celebrates his feast day during the 30th of November, every year.

The second oldest parish is the Nuestra Señora de la Merced Parish (F-1937) in Bahay Pare, Candaba, Pampanga where the miraculous and oldest image of Our Lady of Mercy in the Philippines is enshrined. Devotees flock to the parish to ask Mary to intercede for their spiritual, mental, and physical health, for their families and studies, and for the increase of vocations to the priesthood and consecrated life. The image is well known for her Dalit as She visits different places.

On August 22, 2021, "Nuestra sa Pinac" or "Nuestra Señora de la Merced sa Pinac", a statue of Our Lady of Mercy along the Candaba-Baliuag Road was blessed by the Most Rev. Florentino G. Lavarias, D.D, Archbishop of San Fernando with Most. Rev. Paciano Aniceto during the Memorial of the Queenship of Mary. It has become a local tourist spot.

The other parishes in the town are Virgen de Lourdes Parish (F-1983) in Talang, Señor Salvador Parish (F-1985) in Salapungan, and Lord's Baptism Parish (F-1996) in Pasig. The parishes are under the jurisdiction of the Roman Catholic Archdiocese of San Fernando, Pampanga.

One of the popular religious site in Candaba is in the barangay "Pulong Gubat". It pulls many pilgrims who believe that Nuestro Señor de la Paciencia will cure their illness or grant their wishes.

Economy 

The Candaba Swamp (Pinac, Pinak) absorbs most of the flood waters that flow from the western slopes of the Sierra Madre Mountain Range. During the rainy season, the Pampanga River overflows and the swamp is submerged. But it is relatively dry during the dry Season, hence making the land suitable for a variety agricultural production.

Candaba is noted for its production watermelon, that are sold worldwide. The swamps are communal fishing grounds encompassing some 430 km2 of highly arable farmlands. Candaba swamps are very fertile due to its sustained deposits of humus and decaying plant residues. Migrant wild ducks and various wildlife bird from Siberia, New Zealand, Mongolia and other parts of Asia use Candaba as their yearly sanctuary.

Infrastructure
Drainage System
Candaba-San Miguel road is known for being flooded when a typhoon hits Candaba. The drainage system or rip-rap, which is a part of Mayor Jerry Pelayo's road cementing project, was built on both sides of every cemented roads made so the rainwater from other parts of Pampanga will just flow on it and not on the road.

Transportation
Public transport is mainly done by means of jeepneys and tricycles. Jeepneys have their routes as an itinerary route for various places. Candaba-San Miguel road or pinak was fully cemented by 2014.

Telecommunication facilities
Candabas telecommunication facilities and telephone services are provided by the Philippine Long Distance Telephone Company (PLDT), PSE.DGTL, Datelcom, Evangelista Telephone Company and the Pampanga Telecom Company.

Water and power utilities
Waterworks
Candaba will soon have modern waterworks, following the start of a 24 million Peso water supply development project of the Candaba Water District (CWD) with the financial and technical assistance of the Local Water Utilities Administration (LWUA). Other means to get drinking water are water wells.

Electric power
The municipality receives it electric power in from the Pampanga 1 Electric Cooperative (PELCO 1) and from Manila Electric Company (Meralco).

Government

The following are the duly elected officials of this town for the term 2022-2025:

Bird sanctuary

In January 2008, a Philippine record of 17,000 birds (in the 24-hour count) visited the 32,000-hectare Candaba Swamp, sanctuary for migratory birds. There are 80 species of migratory birds were sighted at the 100-hectare fishpond of Mayor Jerry Pelayo in Barangay Doña Simang and in Barangay Paralaya. The rare birds spotted were: the Shrenck's bittern, great bittern, gadwall, coot, Philippine mallard or ducks, and Eurasian spoonbill (Platalea leucorodia). Robert S. Kennedy's book A Guide to the Birds of the Philippines lists endemic and migratory birds which visit the Philippines. Pelayo organized the Ibon-Ebon Festival (“birds and eggs”) on February 1–2. The WBCP recorded three rare species in Candaba swamp: the purple swamphen (Porphyrio porphyrio), Chinese pond heron (Ardeola bacchus) and the black-crowned night heron (Nycticorax nycticorax).

References

Bibliography 

 Gatbonton, Manuel, Ing Candawe, excerpts, 1933.
 Henson, Mariano A., Pampanga and Its Towns (AD 1300-1965), Angeles: 1965.
 Licuanan, Virginia Benitez and Jose Llavador Mira, The Philippines Under Spain: A Compilation and Translation of Original Documents, Quezon City: 1993.
 Pangilinan, Michael Raymon M. (Siuala ding Meangubie), Five Thousand Years of Antiquity: A Timeline of Candaba History, Kapampangan Magazine, ed. by Elmer G. Cato, Year 2004, Issue XV, pp. 11–12.
 Pangilinan, Michael Raymon M. (Siuala ding Meangubie), Candaba: Timelessly Mystical, Kapampangan Magazine, ed. by Elmer G. Cato, Year 2004, Issue XV, pp. 16–17.
 San Agustin, Gaspar de, Conquistas de las Islas Filipinas; 1565–1615, 1st Bilingual Edition, Intramuros: 1998.
 The Historical Data Papers, Candaba, Bureau of Public Schools, 1953
 The Contemporary Chinese Dictionary (Chinese-English Edition), Foreign Language Teaching and Research Press, Beijing 2002.

External links

 Candaba Profile at PhilAtlas.com
 [ Philippine Standard Geographic Code]
Philippine Census Information
Local Governance Performance Management System

Municipalities of Pampanga
Populated places on the Pampanga River